is a right-handed professional baseball pitcher for the Tokyo Yakult Swallows in Nippon Professional Baseball. He was the number 4 draft pick for the Osaka Kintetsu Buffaloes in 2003. During his high school days, he played at Koshien Stadium.

External links

Japan Baseball Daily

1984 births
Living people
People from Matsuyama, Ehime
Baseball people from Ehime Prefecture
Japanese baseball players
Nippon Professional Baseball pitchers
Osaka Kintetsu Buffaloes players
Orix Buffaloes players
Hanshin Tigers players
Tokyo Yakult Swallows players